Pyroderces aellotricha, also known as the Cosmet moth, is a moth of the family Cosmopterigidae. It is found in New Zealand, in Australia and the Cook Islands.

Taxonomy 
This species was first described by Edward Meyrick in 1889 and named Proterocosma aellotricha. Meyrick, when first describing the species, used two specimens collected in Hamilton in January.  In 1915 Meyrick placed this species within the genus Pyroderces. The female lectotype, collected in Hamilton, is held at the Natural History Museum, London.

Description

Meyrick described the species as follows:

Distribution
This species is found in New Zealand, including at the Kermadec Islands, in Tasmania, Australia and in Rarotonga in the Cook Islands. Other than its type locality it has also been collecting in Whangārei.

Hosts 

The larvae of this species feed on ripening seed heads of raupō, and stored maize cobs.

References

Moths described in 1889
aellotricha
Moths of Australia
Moths of New Zealand
Taxa named by Edward Meyrick
Moths of Oceania